WFNO may refer to:

 WFNO (AM), a radio station (1540 AM) licensed to serve Gretna, Louisiana, United States
 KGLA (AM), a radio station (830 AM) licensed to serve Norco, Louisiana, which held the call sign WFNO from 1996 to 2019